Gigantic is an American comedy-drama television series created by Ben and Debby Wolfinsohn. It was produced by Reveille Productions, Grady Twins Productions, and Pacific Bay Entertainment. The series aired on TeenNick from October 8, 2010 to April 22, 2011.

On April 19, 2011, the series was cancelled after one season.

Premise
Gigantic revolves around 17-year-old Anna Moore (Grace Gummer) and her younger brother Walt (Tony Oller), teens who live the lives of Hollywood "it" kids as the children of famous movie star couple John and Jennifer Moore. Anna and Walt have recently returned to Los Angeles after living in Australia for the past two years while their parents were shooting a movie. The series takes a fictional look at the complicated lives of children of Hollywood celebrities, giving an insider view of the glitz, glamour, and A-list parties of Tinseltown. It exposes the life behind the tabloids and gossip blogs, while exploring the difficulties of growing up with superstar parents.

Two stars of the series are real-life children of Hollywood celebrities. Grace Gummer is the daughter of Meryl Streep, and Gia Mantegna is the daughter of Joe Mantegna. Plans for the series include celebrity cameo appearances. Oller's character was written to be a musician and he will be performing in several episodes. In real life, Oller is a singer, musician and composer. In 2012, Oller and Kelley joined up to form the pop duo MKTO.

Cast

Main cast
Grace Gummer portrays Anna Moore, a seventeen-year-old aspiring journalist and actress. She is the eldest daughter of Hollywood actors John and Jennifer Moore. Anna has feelings for Joey, and the two attempted a short-lived relationship upon her return to Los Angeles.
Tony Oller portrays Walt Moore, Anna's sixteen-year-old brother and musician who doesn't date actresses. Walt hopes for a relationship that doesn't involve anything to do with his status as the son to Hollywood A-listers.
Ryan Rottman portrays Joey Colvin, an average guy who has feelings for Anna. However, during Anna's time living in Australia, Joey had a fling with Lulu. Nearly a year later, Lulu returns and reveals they have a son.
Jolene Purdy portrays Piper Katins, Anna's best friend who develops feelings for her family therapist.
Malcolm David Kelley portrays Finn Katins, Walt's best friend and Piper's adoptive brother.
Gia Mantegna portrays Vanessa King, Anna's frenemy and an aspiring actress.

Recurring cast
Helen Slater portrays Jennifer Moore, Anna and Walt's mother who is a famous Hollywood actress.
Patrick Fabian portrays John Moore, Anna and Walt's father who is also one of Hollywood's A-list actors.
Skyler Day portrays Maggie Ritter, Walt's girlfriend. Walt soon finds out she is studying to be an actress.
Laurel Holloman portrays RaeAnne Colvin, Joey's mom.
Emma Caulfield portrays Sasha, Piper's stepmother.
Bianca Collins portrays Lulu Khandan, Vanessa's friend and Joey's former fling. She has a son who was "adopted" by her parents in order to hide the truth from the media.
AJ Lamas portrays Simon Mcrae
Ben Milliken portrays Russell, Anna's old Australian boyfriend

Episodes

Development and production
Gigantic had been in development since 2005. The series was created by the brother and sister team of Ben and Debby Wolfinsohn, who wrote, cast and directed a pilot episode that year. In 2007, Reveille Productions joined forces with Viacom to work on the series. In early 2009, Marti Noxon and Dawn Parouse joined the project as showrunners. Viacom green-lit the series with a 13-episode order in May 2009. Production began in October 2009, with the episode order increased to 18. The series was filmed in the Los Angeles area.

References

External links

2010 American television series debuts
2011 American television series endings
2010s American comedy-drama television series
2010s American teen drama television series
English-language television shows
Television series about families
Television series about teenagers
Television shows set in Los Angeles